This is a list of named linear ordinary differential equations.

A–Z
{| class="wikitable sortable" style="background: white; color: black; text-align: left"
|-style="background: #eee"
!Name
!Order
!Equation
!Applications
|-
|Airy
|2
|
|Optics
|-
|Bessel
|2
|
|Wave propagation
|-
|Cauchy-Euler
|n
|
|
|-
|Chebyshev
|2
|
|Orthogonal polynomials
|-
|Damped harmonic oscillator
|2
|
|Damping
|-
|Frenet-Serret
|1
|
|Differential geometry
|-
|General Laguerre
|2
|
|
|-
|General Legendre
|2
|
|
|-
|Harmonic oscillator
|2
|
|Simple harmonic motion
|-
|Heun
|2
|
|
|-
|Hill
|2
|, (f periodic)
|Physics
|-
|Hypergeometric
|2
|
|
|-
|Kummer
|2
|
|
|-
|Laguerre
|2
|
|
|-
|Legendre
|2
|
|Orthogonal polynomials
|-
|Matrix
|1
|
|
|-
|Picard-Fuchs
|2
|
|Elliptic curves
|-
|Riemann
|2
|

|
|-
|Sturm-Liouville
|2
|
|Applied mathematics
|}

See also 

 List of nonlinear ordinary differential equations
 List of nonlinear partial differential equations
 List of named differential equations

 
Equations, differential, ordinary, linear